Herbert Wilkinson Ayre (22 October 1882 – 22 November 1966) was a footballer who played in The Football League for Grimsby Town.

In 1953, he married Eileen Hotson.

References

English footballers
Grimsby Town F.C. players
English Football League players
1882 births
1966 deaths
Association football defenders